Shooting at the 1984 Summer Paralympics consisted of 29 events.

Medal summary

Men's events

Women's events

Mixed events

References 

 

1984 Summer Paralympics events
1984
Paralympics